Live is a live performance album released by former Blue band-member and singer-songwriter Simon Webbe, made available on May 28, 2007, exclusively via the Concert Live website. The album was recorded live at the National Indoor Arena in Birmingham. The album was also made available to download straight after the concert performance. The album contains a variety of tracks, covering his entire career, including tracks from his time with Blue, both his solo albums, and covers of other artists, such as The Rolling Stones, Oasis, The Killers and Muse, as well as new tracks pencilled to be included on his upcoming third studio album.

Track listing

Release history

References

Simon Webbe albums
2007 live albums